Rim Rock Wind Farm is located near Cut Bank, Montana. Owned by NaturEner, this $370 million, 189 megawatt (MW) wind farm has been operational since 2012, and is Montana's largest wind-producing facility to be built in a single phase.

Details 

The project was originally developed by Great Plains Wind & Energy LLC, and purchased in 2006 by the Spanish company NaturEner.  NaturEner subsequently partnered with Morgan Stanley to finance the facility.  Construction began in October 2011, and operation began in December 2012. There are 126 Acciona AW77 wind turbines, rated to operate at 1.5 MW each.  This is NaturEner's third project in the United States, and nearly doubled the company's electricity production in the country when completed. The energy harnessed is used to power approximately 60,000 homes in Toole and Glacier counties in Montana, as well as in California.

In December 2013, San Diego Gas & Electric filed a lawsuit against NaturEner, claiming that NaturEner hid the possibility that nearby eagles would be harmed by the wind farm.  NaturEner in turn filed a lawsuit against the state utility, claiming that the utility wanted out of the contract. Justices of the Montana Supreme Court ruled that the contractual issue would have to be resolved in Californian courts (and not Montana courts). No further announcements on the case have been made.

Electricity production 

(*) partial year of operation

See also

Wind power in Montana
Glacier Wind Farm
List of wind farms in the United States

References

External links
VIDEO: Rim Rock Wind Farm

Energy infrastructure completed in 2012
Wind farms in Montana
Buildings and structures in Glacier County, Montana
Buildings and structures in Toole County, Montana